Mykhaylenko or Mykhailenko is a Ukrainian last name derived from the Ukrainian first name Mykhailo or Mykhaylo. Russian spelling: Mikhailenko or  Mikhaylenko. It may refer to:

 Dmitry Mikhaylenko (footballer, born 1995), Russian football player
 Dmitry Mikhaylenko (footballer, born 2000), Russian football player
 Dmytro Mykhaylenko (born 1973), Soviet and Ukrainian football player and coach
 Volodymyr Mykhailenko (born 1973), retired male decathlete from Ukraine

See also
 
 

Ukrainian-language surnames
Patronymic surnames
Surnames from given names